Hand is a surname. Notable persons with that surname include:
Augustus C. Hand, U.S. Congressman
Augustus Noble Hand, U.S. federal judge
Bill Hand, English association footballer
Brad Hand, American baseball player
Daithí Hand, hurling manager
Da'Shawn Hand, American football player
David Hand (bishop), first Anglican Archbishop of Papua New Guinea
David Hand (animator), American animator and director of Disney movies
David Hand (statistician), British statistician
Debra Hand, American artist
Dora Hand, dance hall singer in the American Old West
Edward Hand, American Revolutionary War general
Elizabeth Hand, American author
Eoin Hand, Irish footballer, manager and sports commentator
Frederic Hand, composer
Gerry Hand, former Australian politician
Harrison Hand (born 1998), American football player
Jack Hand (1912—1995), American sports reporter
James Hand, Irish footballer
James Hand (musician), American country-music singer & songwriter
Jamie Hand, English footballer
Jeffrey Lynn Hand, American suspected serial killer
Jessica Hand, British diplomat and ambassador
John Hand (rower), Canadian rower
John Hand (priest), Irish priest
John P. Hand, American jurist
Jon Hand, American football player
Kelli Hand, American techno musician and DJ
Learned Hand, New York jurist
Nevyl Hand, Australian rugby league footballer
Norman Hand, American football defensive tackle
Peter Hand, Prussian founder of the Peter Hand Brewing Company in Chicago, Illinois, US
Rich Hand, American baseball player
Robert Hand, American astrologer
T. Millet Hand, former member of the U.S. House of Representatives
Tony Hand, Scottish ice hockey player
William Hand, yacht designer

Handt is the surname of:
Angelika Handt
Johann Christian Simon Handt, (1794 -1863) German-born Australian minister

See also
Mr. Hand (disambiguation)
Hands (surname)
Handel (disambiguation)
Handle (disambiguation)
Hendl
Hendel